Lew McCreary is an American author, editor, and speaker.

McCreary was born on September 21, 1947. He has authored three novels to sparse but positive reviews; in the New York Times book review of 1991's The Minus Man, acclaimed author Anne Rice said, "This is a challenging, disturbing and deeply memorable novel." In 1999 The Minus Man was made into an independent film starring Owen Wilson, Brian Cox, Janeane Garofalo, Mercedes Ruehl and several other notable actors, as well as Sheryl Crow and Dwight Yoakam.

In addition to his novels, McCreary has worked as a Senior Editor for the Harvard Business Review and previously as editorial director of CXO Media, Inc., founding the security publication CSO Magazine and frequently serving a source for media outlets on issues of technology and security. He has served as a technology consultant for The Wall Street Journal and the Associated Press and has appeared on syndicated radio shows such as Marketplace as well as Bloomberg Radio, UPI Radio, Wall Street Journal Radio and USA Radio. McCreary's broadcast credits also include appearances on CNN and CNBC as well as WBZ-TV (Boston), WGBH-TV (Boston), and New England Cable News.

He has also written a number of unpublished novels.

McCreary graduated from Wesleyan University with a degree in English, and lives in Waltham, Massachusetts.

Novels
Mount's Mistake 1987
The Minus Man 1991
The Houseguest 2001

References

 https://www.nytimes.com/1991/10/20/books/crime-mystery-poetry-and-poison.html
http://imdb.com/name/nm0566974/
https://web.archive.org/web/20060329081124/http://www.newenglandfilm.com/news/archives/99august/mcceary.htm
https://web.archive.org/web/20060114183924/http://www.cio.com/info/expert.html?ID=10017

1947 births
Living people
Harvard University staff
20th-century American novelists
21st-century American novelists
American male novelists
Wesleyan University alumni
20th-century American male writers
21st-century American male writers